Sandro Galli (born 4 May 1987) is a Swiss football defender, who currently plays for SR Delémont in the Swiss Challenge League.

External links

1987 births
Living people
Swiss men's footballers
FC Thun players
SR Delémont players
Swiss Super League players
Association football defenders